BharatNet, also known as Bharat Broadband Network Limited (BBNL), is a central public sector undertaking, set up by the Department of Telecommunications, a department under Ministry of Communications of the Government of India for the establishment, management, and operation of the National Optical Fibre Network to provide a minimum of 100 Mbit/s broadband connectivity to all 250,000-gram panchayats in the country, covering nearly 625,000 villages, by improving the middle layer of nation-wide broadband internet in India to achieve the goal of Digital India.

BharatNet Phase-I, connecting 100,000 village councils covering 300,000 villages, was completed by December 2017. BharatNet Phase-II will be completed by 31 March 2023 to connect the remaining 150,000 village councils covering 325,000 villages in 16 states (July 2021 update).

BharatNet is the world's largest rural broadband connectivity program, which is built under the Make in India initiative with no involvement of foreign companies. It is both an enabler and a beneficiary of other key government schemes, such as Digital India, Make in India, the National e-Governance Plan, UMANG, Bharatmala, Sagarmala, Parvatmala, the dedicated freight corridors, industrial corridors, and UDAN-RCS.

History

Origin and slow pace of implementation (2011)

On 25 October 2011, the Government of India approved the National Optical Fibre Network (NOFN) initiative, later renamed as BharatNet, to connect all 250,000 gram panchayats in the country covering nearly 625,000 villages, by utilizing the existing optical fibre network and extending it to the gram panchayats. To achieve this, Bharat Broadband Network was incorporated as a Special Purpose Vehicle(SPV) on 25 February 2012 under Companies Act of 1956. Between 2011 and 2014, project did not take off as planned, and only 350 km of optical fibre, out of 300,000 km optical fibre network needed for the Phase-I, was laid. Between 2014 and 2017, the original Phase-I target of laying 300,000 km of optical fibre was completed under the new BJP government.

Implementation boost in 2014 

The BharatNet project picked up pace under the Digital India initiative after Prime Minister Narendra Modi came to power, he renamed the project as the "BharatNet", made several changes to expedite the project, significantly enhanced the BharatNet funding to several billion dollars under the Digital India, set ambitious time-bound implementations deadlines, appointed government public sector units (BSNL, RailTel, and PowerGrid Corp) for the swift implementation and monitoring, and to bypass the right of way issues for laying the optical fibre cable network the existing government-owned roads, rail lines, and power lines were used. Bangalore based United Telecoms Limited won the bid, being almost 80% lower than the second-lowest bidder ITI Limited followed by Tejas, STL, etc. BharatNet collaborated with other government entities such as C-DOT, Telecommunications Consultants India Limited and National Informatics Centre for the design and rollout plan of BharatNet NOFN Project. BharatNet assigned the execution work of network roll out to several other Government of India Public Sector Units, namely BSNL, RailTel and Power Grid Corporation of India. Project was rolled out as a collaboration between the Union Government (to provide broadband connectivity at sub-district Block-level), state governments (optical fibre to gram panchayat level) and private sector companies (Wi-Fi hotspots in each village and connections to the individual homes).

Implementation partners

There are 36 states and union territories of India, including 28 states and 9 UTs. BSNL was awarded work for 18 of these, RailTel received work in 8 and Power Grid Corporation of India in 5. BSNL was awarded work for 18+ states and UTs, namely Andaman and Nicobar Islands, Assam, Bihar, Chandigarh, Chhattisgarh, Haryana, Jammu and Kashmir, Karnataka, Kerala, Lakshadweep, Madhya Pradesh, Maharashtra, Punjab, Rajasthan, Sikkim, Uttar Pradesh (divided into two projects, UP East and UP West), Uttarakhand and West Bengal. RailTel was awarded work for 8+ states and UTs, namely Arunachal Pradesh, Gujarat, Nagaland, Manipur, Mizoram, Meghalaya, Puducherry and Tripura. Power Grid Corporation of India was awarded work for 5 states, namely Andhra Pradesh, Himachal Pradesh, Jharkhand, Odisha and Telangana. Delhi is included with Phase-I BSNL work for Haryana. Goa is also included with Phase-I BSNL work for Maharastra. Dadra and Nagar Haveli and Daman and Diu are included with Phase-II work for RailTel. Tripura is likely included with Phase-II RailTel work for the Northeast India.

Project features

Benefits 

BharatNet will provide more employment opportunities, improved service delivery (online e-gram panchayat services, e-governance, e-education, e-health, e-medicine, e-grievances, e-agriculture, e-citizen, etc.), and an impetus to the Make in India, Digital India and Startup India initiatives. According to Morgan Stanley's research, of India's 33% internet penetration in November 2017 only 15% and 2% of total internet users use online shopping and retail shopping respectively, estimated to go up to 78% penetration, 62% online shoppers and 15% online retail shopper respectively by 2027.

As per study by the ICRIER, every 10% increase in the usage of internet in India will add  leading to a 3.3% increase in GDP of India, a number that will go up after the completion of Phase-II in March 2019. By the end of BharatNet Phase-II in March 2019, the total current fibre optical network will grow by 100% to 10 million kilometres. This 100% increment in the fibre optic network would result in several hundred percent increment in the internet usage when in addition to 625,000 villages (each with minimum 100 Mbit/s), 2,500,000 government institutions and 5,000,000 households will also be connected to the BharatNet broadband by the time it is completed.

To put the potential gains things in perspective, during the early phase of the project in 2018, India had a population of 1.3 billion people (1.36 billion in 2021), 1.23 billion Aadhaar digital biometric identities, 1.21 billion mobile phones, 446 million smartphones, 560 million internet users (800  million in 2021), 35% internet penetration (57% in 2021), and 51% growth in e-commerce. BharatNet has stated goal of 100 Mbit/s internet speed, and in Q1 2020 India ranked 3rd with 15.34 Mbit/s wireless/mobile internet speed and 70th with 55.76 Mbit/s fixed broadband speed (also see countries by Internet connection speed). BharatNet will expedite broadband and smartphone penetration and speed and their multiplier impact on the economy.

Funding 

The government has discounted the bulk BharatNet bandwidth rates to the commercial telecom operators by 76% to enable them to offer the highly discounted, affordable, competitive, and commercially viable BharatNet-enabled wireless cellular 4G broadband deals to the rural customers. The  union government share of funding will come from the Universal Services Obligation Fund of the Department of Telecommunications. It will be rolled out with the additional funding by state governments to connect all gram panchayats in India.

Make in India

Both the optical fibre and the Gigabit-capable passive optical network broadband equipment, made to account for the dust and power outage issues in the rural areas, are made in India by C-DOT with no involvement of foreign companies. GPON products (see below) supplied by United Telecoms Limited (UTL) which are manufactured in India and the technology is indigenously developed by Centre for Development of Telematics (C-DOT).

Bharat Net as middle layer 

BharatNet is the "internet" layer in the "Internet Key Layers" diagram and it is designed to provide first four layers of the OSI model, namely the physical layer, data link layer, network layer, and transport layer.

The components of the BharatNet architecture in the concept diagram are as follows.

National level connectivity: GPON technology 

The "Gigabit passive optical network: (GPON)technology at the national level: Passive optical network network architecture brings fibre cabling and digital signals to the homes, using the point-to-multipoint communication design that enables a single optical fibre to serve multiple premises. Design based on the ITU standard G.984 and TEC spec GR no.PON-01/02 Apr 2008 provides higher bandwidth and efficiency due to the bigger variable-length network packets, allowing more efficient packaging of user traffic with segmented frame, offering higher quality of service (QoS) and low latency for delay-sensitive voice and video traffic.

A GPON brings fibre cabling and signals to the home using a point-to-multipoint scheme that enables a single optical fibre to serve multiple premises. Encryption maintains data security in this shared environment. The architecture uses passive (unpowered) optical splitters, reducing the cost of equipment compared to point-to-point architectures.

The GPON standard differs from other passive optical network standards in that it achieves higher bandwidth and higher efficiency using larger, variable-length packets. GPON offers efficient packaging of user traffic, with frame segmentation allowing higher quality of service (QoS) for delay-sensitive voice and video communications traffic. The main components of GPON technology are OLT, ONT/ONU, Fiber-optic splitter and Optical Fibre Cables. The ITU standard G-984 series as well as TEC spec GR no.PON-01/02 Apr 2008 define the GPON technology.
C-DOT has also inked technology transfer pacts with six Indian vendors which include Indian Telephone Industries Limited (ITI Ltd), Tejas Networks, VMC, Sai Systems, UTL and SM Creative to manufacture the gear on winning the contracts.
UTL emerged as the competitive bid winner and obtained the GPON supply contract for a value of approximately Rs 1000 Cr. The companies like ITI Ltd, Tejas Networks, Sterlite, ZTE and Larsen & Toubro lost this deal to UTL. The rollout of GPON is being carried out and it is expected that by March 2015 around 60000 villages will be connected.

Community Development Block level connectivity 

 Optical line terminal at subdistrict block level: OLT device installed at each Block (district subdivision) will serve as the BharatNet's national-level service provider's endpoint of a passive optical network and perform a conversion between the electrical signals used by the service provider's equipment and the fibre optic signals used by the passive optical network.

Gram panchayat level level connectivity 

 Optical fibre cable to each gram panchayat: The connectivity from OLT at Subdistrict-Block-level to each gram panchayat is provided by the optical fibre point of presence. Optical fibre technology provides high bandwidth, low maintenance, and a scalable network but requires time to roll out the physical network. End-to-end encryption is used to ensure data security in this shared network. 
 Beam splitters and combiners: The beam splitter (downstream; upstream is called the "combiner") is an optical device that splits a beam of light in two, thus providing the ability to connect multiple gram panchayats along the way to the single optical fibre cable. Use of the "passive" (unpowered) fibre optic splitter reduces the operational cost of equipment compared to the point-to-point technology (Wi-Fi, requires power). 
 Optical network terminals at gram panchayat level: ONT, also called ONU, are the devices that transmit signals to the customer premises (each gram panchayat in this case) using fibre optic technology in a fibre-to-the-premises system. BharatNet will sign contracts with internet service provider (ISP) telecom companies to set up Wi-Fi hotspots (connected to fibre optic network via ONT), and also to provide optical fibre connections to the individual houses or institutes needing relatively much higher speed dedicated connection. As throughput requirements of a village, institute, or house increase, they will require dedicated fibre optical connections instead of village-level shared Wi-Fi. Each house or institute with a dedicated fibre optical connection will also require its own ONT installed by the service provider, though within the house or institute they can have their own Wi-Fi setup. A Common Service Centre panchayat kiosk for the online government e-services will be provided at each gram panchayat level.

Last mile connectivity 

 Hotspot (Wi-Fi) at each village-level within the gram panchayat: Each gram panchayat is connected by the low-maintenance fibre optic technology, and each village under the gram panchayat is connected by a Wi-Fi hotspot tower of up to 15-meter height with a range of 5 to 7 km installed by ISP telecom companies by using short-range 5.48 GHz unused radiofrequency. Comparatively easier and faster to deploy higher-maintenance wireless technology, for Wi-Fi Hotspots in each village under the gram panchayat, is used only for the last mile connectivity. Wi-Fi router and Antenna require continuous supply of power, hence an emergency power system is needed during the power blackout, e.g. power inverter with a backup battery that may be recharged by the solar panel. Reliance Jio, Idea Cellular, Airtel, and Vodafone have already connected their 4G Base Towers to BharatNet fibre optic OLT to provide last mile wireless coverage.
 Connectivity to the individual homes: The Local service providers provide broadband connections to individual homes, offering employment and entrepreneurship opportunities to village youth.

Once all the gram panchayats have been connected by the dedicated fibre optical network, the last mile connectivity to all villages will be provided by the commercial telecom operators by expanding the current national network of 38,000 Wi-Fi hotspots to 700,000 Wi-Fi hotspots to cover all 625,000 villages in India. , union government subsidy support will be given to the telecom service operators for rolling out Wi-Fi hotspots in commercially non-viable villages. BharatNet has offered the bulk broadband bandwidth at 75% discounted rates to the commercial telecom operators so that they can offer deeply discounted monetised competitive deals to the rural wireless broadband customers. Commercial operators Reliance Jio, Bharti Airtel, Idea Cellular and Vodafone have already connected their 4G-based-broadband base towers to BharatNet at various locations to provide the high speed last mile wireless broadband connectivity.

The central government will set up sufficient Wi-Fi hotspots to cover 100 million citizens by 2020, and tender will be floated for this soon (as of November 2017).

HRD ministry has instructed 50,000 colleges and technical in India to offer free Wi-Fi to students and staff with capped free data quota, after which data will have to be purchased. Out of these Reliance Jio has offered to deploy free Wi-Fi connectivity to 38,000 colleges, which has been supported by Telecom Regulatory Authority of India (TRAI) and the Department of Telecommunications (DoT).

Some Startups, such as Velmenni Research, under the Startup India, are working on solutions to offer Li-Fi access via LED lights at homes at a speed 100 faster than ordinary WI-FI bandwidth.

Implementation 

BharatNet is a middle layer for providing broadband connectivity across all Community Development Blocks (CDB), 250,000 village gram panchayats covering 630,000 inhabited villages of states and union territories of India. As of July 2021,  Phase-I was complete and 150,000 Gram Panchayats and associated villages had been service ready  with 5.09 lakh km of Optical Fibre Cable already laid, the 29,500 crore (US$4 billion) PPP tender for remaining nearly 100,000 gram panchayats and all the individual inhabited villages under hose panchayats spread across 16 states was floated in 2021 with target date for broadband connectivity of 2023.

BharatNet Phase-I (Completed: Dec 2017)

It connected 100,000 gram panchayat, covering 300,000 villages by laying 300,000 km of optical fibre network. 13 states and UTs in this phase were: Andaman and Nicobar Islands, Chandigarh, Delhi, Goa, Haryana, Karnataka, Kerala, Lakshadweep, Manipur, Meghalaya, Puducherry, Sikkim and West Bengal.

To provide the last mile connectivity for the 100,000-gram panchayats in Phase-I, contracts were signed to connect 30,500 village panchayats by Vodafone, 30,000 village panchayats by Reliance Jio. 2,000 by Vodafone and 1,000 by Idea Cellular, these Wi-Fi hotspots were activated after connecting BharatNet fibre optics OLT to commercial operator's cell phone base stations. (Latest weekly update)

BharatNet Phase-II (Target: March 2023)

BharatNet Phase-II, will connect the remaining nearly 145,000 gram panchayats covering 325,000 villages through additional 1 million km of optical fibre.

Merger of BSNL and BBNL 
On 27th July 2022. The cabinet decided to merge state owned Bharat Sanchar Nigam Limited and Bharat Broadband Network Limited

See also 

 Internet in India
 List of countries by Internet connection speeds
 List of countries by number of broadband Internet subscriptions
 List of countries by number of Internet users
 List of countries by smartphone penetration

References

Citations

External links

Official live current overall summary status report 
Official Phase-I status breakdown by state
Phase-II Planning, IIT Bombay
Collection of Scripts to analyse the district wise data of the progress.

Telecommunications companies of India
Government-owned companies of India
Proposed infrastructure in India